"When the Fleet Comes Sailing Home" is a World War I song written by Carl M. Legg and composed by Jay Flanagan. The song was first published in 1918 by Songland Music in Brooklyn, New York City. The sheet music cover depicts a mother, wife, and son in uniform waving at an arriving transport ship.

The sheet music can be found at the Pritzker Military Museum & Library.

References 

Bibliography

1918 songs
Songs about boats
Songs about sailors
Songs about soldiers
Works about the United States Navy
Songs of World War I